Bromley Mountain is located in southern Vermont, United States and is part of the Green Mountains.  It is located in the town of Peru, Bennington County, seven miles (11 km) east of Manchester, Vermont and just west of the Peru town center.  It is a popular destination for skiing and snowboarding.

The Bromley Mountain resort was founded by Fred Pabst Jr., the grandson of the famous Captain Frederick Pabst, the founder of Pabst Blue Ribbon beer. It is home to 47 trails, including 6 glades and 3 freestyle terrain parks. Trails range from beginner to expert and are served by 10 lifts. In SKI Magazine's October 2014 issue, Bromley was ranked within the top three "Kid Friendly" mountains in the East on their list of Top-Ranked Eastern Ski Resorts.

Due to its southern exposure, Bromley is known as "The Sun Mountain."  The Long Trail and Appalachian Trail go over the mountain.

History 
In 1935 John Perry, David Parsons, and Rolando Palmedo planned the "Bromley Run" from an airplane. The following year the first trail was cut on the west side of the mountain by Ralph Hutchinson and the Works Progress Administration and in 1938, Fred Pabst Jr. son of Pabst Brewing Company founder, Frederick Pabst opened Little Bromley Ski Area as part of his Ski Tows Inc empire. In January 1943, a 2,800 foot J-bar opened between the Twister and East Meadow slopes and a second J-bar opened shortly after. With the addition of the J-bars, Bromley was able to advertise a mile long tandem lift serving 1,300 vertical feet, making it a major player in the New England ski industry. In 1958, Bromley  installed a new 5,700 foot Riblet double chairlift to the summit, making Bromley one of only four ski areas in the state with a chairlift. Bromley's next big step came after a rough winter season of 1964-65. For the 1965-67 season, Pabst invested in a large Larchmont snowmaking system composed of more than 50 snow-guns, 18 miles of snowmaking pipe, and 9 million gallons of stored water. The system covered 23 trails and was advertised as the world's largest. That same season, two new Riblet chairlifts were installed. 

Facing heart problems, Fred Pabst Jr. stepped down as Bromley president in 1971. After he left, a large expansion took place during the 1974 season when Bromley spent $1 million on snowmaking and lift additions. To attract business in the summer, in 1976 Stig Albertsson installed North America's first triple-tracked alpine slide. On March 1, 1977, Fred Pabst Jr. died of a heart attack. After his passing, Bromley was sold to Stratton in 1979 and changed hands to Moore and Munger, Inc the following spring. In 1984 the Sun Chair was finished and a new Von-Roll double was added to the lower half. Bromley was sold again in 1987 to Magic Mountain's Simon Oren who sold it to Joe O'Donnell and Petros Palandijan shortly after in 1990. During the 1997-98 season, the last of the original J-bars were removed as well as the first chairlift. The Sun Mountain Express Doppelmayr Detachable Quad chairlift was also installed, cutting the ride to the summit by more than half. In June 2011 O'Donnell hired Brian and Tyler Fairbank of the Fairbank Group to operate the resort.  The Fairbank Group also operates the O'Donnell owned Jiminy Peak Mountain Resort.

Statistics
Important facts
Year Opened:  1936
Number of Lifts:  9
High-speed quads: 1
Quad chairs:  1
Double chairs:  4
Surface lifts:  3 
Uphill Lift Capacity: 10,806 skiers per hour
On Mountain Lodging: Bromley Village and Sun Lodge 
Elevation
Base: 1,950 feet
Summit:  3,284 feet
Vertical drop:  1,334 feet
Longest run:  2.5 miles - Runaround
Snowmaking:  86%
Types of runs
Beginner:  32%
Intermediate:  37% 
Advanced:  31%

Trails

Lifts

Grooming
Bromley has two Bison snow groomers and one Bombardier BR 350 groomer.

Lodges
Base Lodge: Located at the base and main entrance to the mountain, with ski shop, rentals, tickets, two cafeterias, the Wild Boar Restaurant and Bar, daycare, and ski and snowboard school desks.
Kid's Cabin: Located in the Learning Center near the Star Carpet, it houses a bathroom, hot chocolate machine, and water cooler.

Ticket Prices
As of 2022, a one-day ticket to Bromley costs $89. Back in the early 2000s, an adult ticket cost around $50 and in the early 90s a ticket was around $35. During the mountain's first season, a one-day adult ticket was only $4.

Summer Attractions
During the summer, Bromley has a Mountain Adventure Park which includes an alpine slide, multiple trampolines, a climbing wall, mini golf, space bikes, a giant swing, a waterslide, a Kidzone fun park, and scenic chairlift rides. The mountain resort also has an Treetop Adventure Course with 5 different challenging courses of ropes, zip-lines, and bridges. Their last large attraction is the Sun Mountain Flyer, a half-mile zip-line that goes up to 50mph.

Nearby Mountains
Bromley Mountain's closest neighbors are Stratton Mountain and Magic Mountain. Both mountains are visible from Bromley's peak and within 20 minutes driving distance. Stratton has 94 trails over 600 acres of land and Magic is home to 43 trails and 135 acres.

References 

Mountains of Vermont
Manchester, Vermont
Peru, Vermont
Ski areas and resorts in Vermont
Mountains on the Appalachian Trail
Mountains of Bennington County, Vermont
Tourist attractions in Bennington County, Vermont
Buildings and structures in Bennington County, Vermont